Huawei Symantec Technologies Co. Ltd. was a developer, producer and supplier of network security, storage and computing solutions. The joint venture was disbanded in March 2012  when Symantec sold its share in the company to Huawei, which is headquartered in Chengdu, China. Huawei originally owned 51% of the company, while Symantec owned 49%.

Huawei is a Chinese-based company, while Symantec Corporation (NASDAQ: SYMC) is a US-based corporation headquartered in Mountain View, California.

History
2000: Huawei started R&D in the security technology field; Symantec is a provider of antivirus and security software 
2004: Huawei started R&D in storage technology field
2005: Symantec acquires Veritas Software, manufacturer of Information Lifecycle Management software
2007 (May): Huawei and Symantec sign an agreement for the establishment of a joint venture in order to provide end-to-end solutions in the domain of converging network, security, and storage and computing technologies.
2008 (February): Huawei Symantec was established.
2012 (March): Huawei acquires the 49% of shares held by the Symantec Corporation at a price of about 530 million U.S. dollars or 3.4 billion yuan.

Technological convergence and R&D
Huawei Symantec is a holder of more than 300 patents in storage and network security field, and about 30 of them were accepted as formal technological standards. Huawei Symantec's technologists participate in various standardization organizations, including holding chair and vice-chair posts. More than 50% of employees are engaged in research and development activities with labs located in Beijing, Shenzhen, Hangzhou in China, and in India.

Acquisition by Huawei
On November 14, 2011, Beijing Time, Huawei and Symantec reached an agreement on a transaction where Huawei acquired Symantec's 49% stake in Huawei Symantec Technologies Co., Ltd. (Huawei Symantec) for US$530 million. Upon closing the agreement gave Huawei full ownership of Huawei Symantec. Huawei Symantec and Symantec Corporation are two separate entities.

References

2008 establishments in China
2008 establishments in California
2012 disestablishments in California
Software companies established in 2008
Software companies disestablished in 2012
Companies based in Chengdu
Chinese-foreign joint-venture companies
Huawei